Rio is an unincorporated community in Spalding County, in the U.S. state of Georgia.

History
Rio is a name derived from Spanish meaning "river".

References

Unincorporated communities in Spalding County, Georgia
Unincorporated communities in Georgia (U.S. state)